Heteroteuthidinae is a subfamily of bobtail squid encompassing five genera and around ten species.

Classification
Subfamily Heteroteuthinae
Genus Amphorateuthis
Amphorateuthis alveatus
Genus Heteroteuthis
Subgenus Heteroteuthis
Heteroteuthis dispar, Odd Bobtail
Heteroteuthis weberi
Subgenus Stephanoteuthis
Heteroteuthis dagamensis
Heteroteuthis hawaiiensis
Heteroteuthis serventyi
Genus Iridoteuthis
Genus Nectoteuthis
Nectoteuthis pourtalesi
Genus Sepiolina
Sepiolina nipponensis, Japanese Bobtail
Genus Stoloteuthis
Stoloteuthis leucoptera, Butterfly Bobtail Squid

References

External links
 Tree of Life: Heteroteuthinae
CephBase: Heteroteuthinae

Bobtail squid
Taxa named by Adolf Appellöf